The 2017 NASCAR Pinty's Series was the eleventh season of the NASCAR Pinty's Series. Beginning on May 21 at Canadian Tire Motorsport Park, the season consisted of thirteen races at eleven different venues in Canada. The season ended at Jukasa Motor Speedway on September 23. Cayden Lapcevich is the defending Drivers' Champion. Alex Labbé won the championship when the Green Flag dropped at the last race, as there were not enough entries for Labbé to lose that many points that Kevin Lacroix could have taken the championship. Labbé won the championship by a 16-point margin over Lacroix.

Drivers

Schedule

Notes

The race at Kawartha Speedway was originally scheduled for 16 September, but was removed from the schedule by NASCAR on 2 August following recent management changes. The season finale moved to 23 September to the newly reopened track Jukasa Motor Speedway.

Results and Standings

Races

Notes
1 – Starting grid was set by the fastest lap times from the first Velocity Prairie Thunder Twin 100 race.
2 – The qualifying session for the Bumper to Bumper 300 was cancelled due to weather. The starting line-up was decided by Practice results.

Drivers' championship

(key) Bold – Pole position awarded by time. Italics – Pole position set by final practice results or Owners' points. * – Most laps led.

Notes
1 – Andrew Ranger got ill after practice of the LUXXUR 300 presented by Bayer and before qualifying the team put Larry Jackson in the car.

See also
2017 Monster Energy NASCAR Cup Series
2017 NASCAR Xfinity Series
2017 NASCAR Camping World Truck Series
2017 NASCAR K&N Pro Series East
2017 NASCAR K&N Pro Series West
2017 NASCAR Whelen Modified Tour
2017 NASCAR PEAK Mexico Series
2017 NASCAR Whelen Euro Series

References

External links

Pinty's Series Standings and Statistics for 2017

NASCAR Pinty's Series

NASCAR Pinty's Series